Accurate religious demographics are difficult to obtain in Saudi Arabia, but it is believed that there are approximately 1.8 million Christians in Saudi Arabia. Christians in Saudi Arabia are reported to face widespread discrimination, including both foreign-born Christians and native Christians.

Early history
 
Christians had formed churches in Arabia prior to the time of Muhammad in the 7th century. Ancient Arab traders had traveled to Jerusalem for trade purposes and heard the gospel from Saint Peter (Acts 2:11) and Paul the Apostle spent several years in Arabia (Galatians 1:17), later further strengthened by the ministry of Saint Thomas who went to Arabia, Mesopotamia, Persia and later to the Indian subcontinent.
 
One of the earliest church buildings ever, known as Jubail Church, is located in Saudi Arabia; it was built around the 4th century.
 
Some parts of modern Saudi Arabia (such as Najran) were predominantly Christian until the 7th to 10th century, when most Christians were expelled or converted to Islam or left the region via the Sea route to Asia, with which merchant trade already existed, others migrated north to Jordan and Syria and settled into those new places. Some Arab Christians who remained lived as crypto-Christians, or secret Christians. Some Arabian tribes, such as Banu Taghlib and Banu Tamim, followed Christianity. 
 
Ancient Arabian Christianity has largely vanished from the region, due to conversion and migration.

Persecution

On June 15, 1858, 21 Christian residents of Jeddah, then an Ottoman town of 5,000 predominantly Muslim inhabitants, were massacred, including the French and British consuls, by "some hundreds of Hadramites, inhabitants of Southern Arabia". Twenty-four others, mostly Greeks and Levantines, some "under British protection" plus the daughter of the French consul and the French interpreter, both badly wounded, escaped and took refuge, some by swimming to it, aboard the ship HMS Cyclops.

International Christian Concern (ICC) protested what it reported as the 2001 detention of 11 Christians in Saudi Arabia, for practicing their religion in their homes. In June 2004, at least 46 Christians were arrested in what the ICC described as a "pogrom-like" action by Saudi police. The arrests took place shortly after the media reported that a Quran had been desecrated in the Guantanamo Bay detention camp.

Community today 
There are more than 1 million Roman Catholics in Saudi Arabia. Most of them are expatriate Filipinos who work there, but are not Saudi Arabian citizens. , the percentage of Christians of all denominations among the roughly 1.2 million Filipinos in Saudi Arabia was about 90%. There are also Christians from Canada, the United States, New Zealand, Australia, Italy, Greece, South Korea, Ireland, the United Kingdom, India, China, Pakistan, Sri Lanka, Ethiopia, Kenya, Lebanon, Syria, Egypt and as well a number of Christians from sub-Saharan countries who are working in the Saudi Kingdom.

Saudi Arabia allows Christians to enter the country as foreign workers for work or tourism, but does not allow them to practice their faith openly. Saudi Arabia states that they are permitted to privately practice their religion, but this is not codified and raids on private practice by the Committee for the Promotion of Virtue and Prevention of Vice do occur, though these have decreased since their powers were curtailed in 2016. Bringing a Bible and other types of religious texts are allowed into the country as long as it is for personal use.

Although textbooks in Saudi Arabia have moderated their extremist content since 2001, they still contain some content classified as "egregious" such as characterizing Christians and other non-Muslims as liars and are considered to promote religious hatred and intolerance towards non-Muslims, while the NGO Human Rights Watch has also reported rising hate speech against Christians by Saudi leaders.

The Saudi Arabian Mutaween, or Committee for the Promotion of Virtue and the Prevention of Vice (i.e., the religious police) prohibits the practice of any religion other than Islam. Conversion of a Muslim to another religion is considered apostasy, a crime punishable by death if the accused does not recant. There have been no confirmed reports of executions for either crime in modern times. The Government does not permit non-Muslim clergy to enter the country for the purpose of conducting religious services. In spite of this, a 2015 study estimates that there are some 60,000 Christians with a Muslim background living in the country, though that does not mean that all of those are citizens of the country.

Christians and other non-Muslims are prohibited from entering the city of Mecca and the central district of Medina, i.e. in the vicinity inside of King Faisal Road, "1st Ring Road".

There are also Christian communities on expatriate compounds, including Catholic services in the Aramco compound in Dhahran.

Currently there are no official churches in Saudi Arabia. According to the Society of Architectural Heritage Protection Jeddah and the Municipality of Jeddah, a long-abandoned house in Al-Baghdadiyya district has never been an Anglican church, contrary to the "'myth' that had spread on the Internet". However, in 1930 there was a non-Muslim cemetery in Jeddah.

Discovered in 1986, the church ruins at Jubail originally belonged to the Church of the East, a branch of Eastern Christianity in the Middle East.

Recently, the government put a fence around the church to prevent potential tourists from entering. However, the fences have not stopped locals from coming in to vandalise and damage the building.<ref>Crossing the Line L Castoro – 2002 – The lost churches of the Arabian Gulf: recent discoveries on the islands of Sir Bani Yas and Marawah, Abu Dhabi emirate, United Arab Emirates J Elders – Proceedings of the Seminar for Arabian Studies, 2001 "There are two known sites along the Gulf coast of Saudi Arabia, at Jubail (Langfeldt 1994)
and slightly inland at Jebel Berri (Potts 1994). There are unconfirmed but persistent reports of at least one, more probably two church sites on Qatar."</ref> In 2018, Saudi Arabia had its first big mass. In 2022, the taboo around Christmas trees lightened, allowing for open sales and decorations.

Demographics
According to Pew Research Center, the percentage of Christians in Saudi Arabia constitute 4.4% of the country’s population, however, the percentage of Saudi Arabian citizens who are Christians is zero de jure'', as Saudi Arabia forbids religious conversion from Islam and punishes it by death.

See also
 Eastern Orthodox Christianity in Saudi Arabia
 Freedom of religion in Saudi Arabia
 Human rights in Saudi Arabia
 Protestantism in Saudi Arabia
 Roman Catholicism in Saudi Arabia

References